Mossley Halt was a railway station in Mossley, Congleton on the Biddulph Valley line. Mossley Halt was located about 1 and a half miles south of Congleton Railway Station.

History 
Mossley Halt was opened by the North Staffordshire Railway in 1919.

It was used by workers traveling to and from Black Bull Coal Mine.

In 1923 the Chatterley-Whitfeild Collieries ran services to transport their own workers between Mossley Halt, Chell Halt and Biddulph Halt. These services ran twice a day one in the early morning and one a night. These services did not last long.

The London, Midland and Scottish Railway ran 2 services a day between Mossley Halt and Chell Halt, these trains ran at midday to take the noon shift workers to the Collieries and to bring the day shift workers back.

By the time of grouping there was one service on a Saturday that called at  Mossley Halt.

Mossley Halt closed on 13 July 1925.

Facilities
Mossley Halt had one platform with a waiting shelter, a booking office and a platelayers hut.

Route

References 

Disused railway stations in Cheshire
Railway stations in Great Britain closed in 1925
Railway stations in Great Britain opened in 1919
Former North Staffordshire Railway stations
Congleton